Claude Giordan is a Monegasque diplomat and Monaco's current Ambassador of Monaco to the Holy See and to the Order of Sovereign Military Hospital of Saint John of Jerusalem of Rhodes and Malta. He also was Ambassador of Monaco to Russia until 2015 and has presented his credentials to Russian President Dmitry Medvedev on 5 February 2010.

References

Living people
Ambassadors of Monaco to Russia
Year of birth missing (living people)